John Olufemi Otuagomah Sfondo  (born 7 April 1984 in Lagos) is a Nigerian footballer.

Career
Olufemi was on loan to Rovigo from Palermo in summer 2006, but in January 2007, he left for Bellinzona. He then transferred to FC Locarno on February 2008, in a deal effective as of summer 2008.

References

1984 births
Living people
Nigerian footballers
Nigerian expatriate footballers
Palermo F.C. players
Venezia F.C. players
Potenza S.C. players
AC Bellinzona players
Rovigo Calcio players
FC Locarno players
Serie A players
Serie B players
Expatriate footballers in Italy
Expatriate footballers in Switzerland
Association football forwards
Sportspeople from Lagos
Nigerian expatriate sportspeople in Italy
Nigerian expatriate sportspeople in Switzerland